Markiyan Voytsekhovskyy (born November 27, 2003) is a Ukrainian footballer who plays as a midfielder for York United in the Canadian Premier League.

Early life
In his youth, Voytsekhovskyy was part of the Shakhtar Donetsk academy. After moving to Canada, he joined Rush Academy. In 2021, he played with the Guelph United FC U21 team in the League1 Ontario Reserve division.

Club career
In 2022, he joined League1 Ontario club ProStars FC. He was named the league's Young Player of the Year, and was named a league First Team All-Star and was named to the U20 Best XI. After the season, he began training with FC Tigers Vancouver.

In December 2022, he signed his first professional contract with York United FC of the Canadian Premier League for the 2023 season, joining on a two-year contract, with a club option for a further season.

Career statistics

References

External links

2003 births
Living people
Ukrainian footballers
Canadian soccer players
Sportspeople from Lviv
FC Shakhtar Donetsk players
Guelph United F.C. players
ProStars FC players
League1 Ontario players
York United FC players
Association football midfielders